These are the Billboard magazine Dance/Mix Show Airplay number-one hits of 2013.

Note that Billboard publishes charts with an issue date approximately 7–10 days in advance.

See also
2013 in music
List of number-one dance singles of 2013 (U.S.)
List of number-one Dance/Electronic Songs of 2013 (U.S.)

References

External links
BDS Dance Airplay Chart (updated weekly)

2013
United States Dance Airplay